George Hermann Bihlman (February 18, 1895 – February 3, 1985) was an American track and field athlete who competed in the 1920 Summer Olympics. In 1920 he finished seventh in the shot put competition.

References

External links
list of American athletes

1895 births
1985 deaths
American male shot putters
Olympic track and field athletes of the United States
Athletes (track and field) at the 1920 Summer Olympics